Sanneke de Neeling (born 19 April 1996) is a Dutch speed skater who is specialized in the sprint and middle distances.

Career
De Neeling won three medals at the Speed skating at the 2012 Winter Youth Olympics in Innsbruck, Austria. She won the silver medal at the 1500 meters and gold on both the 3000 meters and mass start. At the 2015 World Junior Speed Skating Championships in Warsaw she finished second.

De Neeling was part of the Dutch team which won the ISU World Cup Team sprint event in Heerenveen in December 2015. In January 2016 she won the title at the KNSB Dutch Sprint Championships.

From 2015 until 2018 she was a member of Team LottoNL-Jumbo. She currently skates for Gewest Fryslân.

Personal records

Tournament overview

Source:

World Cup overview

Source:

 GWC = Grand World Cup
 (b) = Division B

References

External links
 
 Team LottoNL-Jumbo profile
 
 

 

1996 births
Living people
Dutch female speed skaters
Sportspeople from Rotterdam
Speed skaters at the 2012 Winter Youth Olympics
Youth Olympic gold medalists for the Netherlands
21st-century Dutch women